Clare is a small unincorporated community in White River Township, Hamilton County, Indiana.

History
The first settlement at Clare was made in about 1830. A post office was established at Clare in 1878, and remained in operation until it was discontinued in 1902.

Geography
Clare Avenue, the town's single street, runs immediately parallel to State Road 37. The town is generally considered to stretch from 211th Street to 216th Street, in the narrow strip of land between State Road 37 and the White River.

References

Unincorporated communities in Hamilton County, Indiana
Unincorporated communities in Indiana
Indianapolis metropolitan area
1830 establishments in Indiana